Nupserha subabbreviata is a species of beetle in the family Cerambycidae. It was described by Maurice Pic in 1916.

References

subabbreviata
Beetles described in 1916